The New York Currency Exchange (NYCE) is an interbank network connecting the ATMs of various financial institutions in the United States and Canada. NYCE also serves as an EFTPOS network for NYCE-linked ATM cards.

NYCE is based in Secaucus, New Jersey.  Rivals of the network include STAR and Discover Card's Pulse. It is owned by Fidelity National Information Services.

Origins
"NYCE" originally started as a local ATM network of banks located in the New York metro area. It was one of the first networks of its kind, originating shortly after the invention of the ATM (automatic teller machine).  Membership was open to all banks, credit unions and savings banks, and as use of ATM's grew the network spread beyond its original New York Metro area; by the early 1990s, NYCE was the largest regional ATM network in the US.

The public brand name, "NYCE", is an acronym for "New York Cash Exchange"; the original corporate name was the New York Switch Corporation.  

The banks which founded and originally owned the network were: National Westminster Bank USA, Chase Manhattan, Manufacturers Hanover, Chemical Bank, Barclays Bank, Marine Midland Bank and the Bank of New York; in later years both BayBank and Fleet Bank from Boston became owners as well.  The original Chairman of the Board was Edward Coakley of National Westminster Bank; some of the other members of the Board of Directors were Donald L. Boudreau and Ron Braco of Chase Manhattan, Gary Roboff and Michael Hegarty of Chemical Bank, Stu Segal and Roger Goldman of National Westminster, Robert Muth of Marine Midland, Bob Shay and Lindsey Lawrence of BayBank, and Dennis Lynch of Fleet.

Current status
At present, NYCE is the primary network of 301,500 ATMs with a customer base of 89 million users.  NYCE is no longer owned by New York and Boston banks; it was wholly owned by Metavante Corporation, formerly a subsidiary of M&I Bank and based in the Milwaukee suburb of Brown Deer, Wisconsin. On October 1, 2009, Metavante officially became a subsidiary of Fidelity National Information Services.

See also
 ATM usage fees

External links
 NYCE ATM network

FIS (company)
Interbank networks